Tây Bắc (literally "Northwest") is one of the regions of Vietnam, located in the mountainous northwestern part of the country. It consists of four provinces: Điện Biên, Lai Châu, Sơn La, and Hòa Bình. Lào Cai and Yên Bái are usually seen as part of the Northwest region. It has a population of about two and a half million.

History
A large area of the region was previously a part of the Sip Song Chau Tai, Tai Autonomous Region, which was dissolved in 1954. It was renamed the "Northwest Autonomous Region" (Khu Tự trị Tây Bắc) in 1961, in order to not highlight just two of the many ethnic groups in this zone. The autonomy was rescinded after the Vietnamese reunification of 1975.

Provinces

See also
Regions of Vietnam

References

 
Regions of Vietnam
Geography of Vietnam